The electoral district of Benambra is one of the electoral districts of Victoria, Australia, for the Victorian Legislative Assembly. The largest settlement is the city of Wodonga. Benambra also includes the towns of Baranduda, Barnawartha, Beechworth, Chiltern, Corryong, Eskdale, Kiewa, Mitta Mitta, Mount Beauty, Rutherglen, Tallangatta, Tangambalanga, Tawonga, Wahgunyah, and Yackandandah. It lies in the Northern Victoria Region of the upper house, the Legislative Council.

The district of Benambra was created by the Electoral Act Amendment Act 1876. taking effect at the 1877 elections.

The district has been held by various conservative parties unbroken since 1877, with the Liberal Party taking the seat from the Nationals in 1976 and retaining it since.

The district is named after Benambra, a small town 28km north of Omeo in Gippsland. The town of Benambra is not actually located in the electoral district. Benambra is thought to be Aboriginal in origin meaning hills with big trees or men spearing eels.

Members for Benambra

Election results

References

External links
 District profile from the Victorian Electoral Commission

Electoral districts of Victoria (Australia)
1877 establishments in Australia
Wodonga
Shire of Indigo
Shire of Towong